Daniel Hernández District is one of sixteen districts of the province Tayacaja in Peru.

References